Asseiceira is a civil parish (Freguesia) in the municipality of Tomar, Portugal. The population in 2011 was 2,943, in an area of 29.08 km².

It is the location of the Battle of Asseiceira, fought on 16 May 1834, the last and decisive engagement of the Portuguese Civil War.

References

Freguesias of Tomar